is an upcoming 2014 Japanese drama film directed by Shinichi Nakada. It was scheduled to be released in July 2014.

Cast
Dori Sakurada

References

External links
 

Japanese drama films
2014 films
2014 drama films
2010s Japanese films